César-Joseph de Bourayne, later Baron Bourayne, (22 February 1768 – 5 November 1817) was a French naval officer, famous for his battles against British ships in the Indian Ocean and South China Sea. He was appointed Rear-admiral in 1814, having been made a Baron in 1811.

A street in Brest bears his name, as does a bay and port of the island of Huahine in French Polynesia.

Career

Origins and youth 
Born in Brest on 22 February 1768, Caesar Bourayne was the 5th child of a family of 13, including two naval officers and two navy commissioners, which earned their mother the nickname "the mother to the seamen”. In 1781, at 13 years old, he embarked on the 80-gun ship of the line Auguste, commanded by the famous captain Louis Antoine de Bougainville. Auguste was part of the fleet of the Comte de Grasse, which operated in the Atlantic against the British during the American Revolutionary War. He participated in the various actions of this campaign including the critical victory at the Battle of the Chesapeake, and the decisive defeat at The Battle of the Saintes. In the 10 years that followed, he continued his training in many engagements in the Caribbean, Africa, Red Sea, Indian Ocean and Southeast Asia.

Early career as an officer 

In 1791, Bourayne was commissioned as an officer and served aboard the 38-gun frigate Venus during the scientific expedition of Rosily. In August 1792 he was commissioned as an officer serving on the frigate Méduse.

By 1793 he had been promoted to lieutenant and served under Charles Linois on the 36-gun frigate Atalante. On 7 May 1794, while hunting for British merchantmen off the coast of Ireland, Atalante and accompanying corvette Levrette came across a convoy protected by two British ships of the line, Swiftsure and St Albans. The British ships moved to intercept, and though Levrette escaped, Atalante was taken after a 48-hour chase. Bourayne was wounded in the action of 7 May 1794 and taken prisoner. He was paroled in the Bantry Bay area for 19 months before he was returned to France in October 1795.

Borayne went on to serve under Admiral Villaret de Joyeuse in the Irish Sea and Caribbean.
In 1800 Bourayne was promoted to Capitaine de frégate, and appointed first officer on Redoutable, and later on Républicain, before commanding the frigate Fidèle from June of that year. On 18 July 1803 he received his promotion to Captaine de vaisseau, on taking command of the recently recaptured 40-gun frigate Minerve, which was now renamed Canonnière.

As captain 
On 14 November 1805, Canonnière sailed from Cherbourg to reinforce Linois at Île de France in the Indian Ocean. When Linois was not to be found there, Bourayne sailed in search of him off the cape of good hope. It was here that he fell in with a fleet of British Indiamen, resulting in the action of 21 April 1806.

After effecting as much repairs as possible at sea, Bourayne steered for Simon's Town, an allied Dutch anchorage. Unknown to him however, it had recently been seized by the English. In a ruse common to marine warfare, the English forts and shipping at the bay flew  the Dutch colours, and so Bourayne sent a boat to shore. At this point the forts changed their colours and began to bombard the frigate. The Canonnière stood out to sea, escaping major damage, but the lieutenant and men aboard the boat were taken prisoner.

Bourayne then set off for Manila, where he could properly repair his ship. This mission was carried out over a six-month round trip, and he continued to operate in the Pacific until making a return to the Isle de France in 1808.

In September 1808, the British 22-gun frigate Laurel arrived off Isle de France, and soon after recaptured a Portuguese ship which had been taken as a prize by the French. Under a flag of truce, the captain of Laurel requested a boat to be sent out from Port Louis to retrieve French ladies captured on board the prize. On board the boat went an officer of Canonnière, to reconnoitre the capabilities of the English ship. Bourayne was satisfied she was no match for Canonniere, and so set out to capture her. This he did, after a notably spirited defence from the smaller frigate.

Bourayne continued to cruise the Indian Ocean, capturing Discovery ( ? ), before returning to Isle de France in 1809. The Canonnière was found there to be now in such a state of disrepair that she was renamed Confiance and sent back to France as a semi-armed merchantman, with Bourayne aboard as a passenger. Very near to her destination however, she was spotted and taken by the 74-gun Valiant, and so Bourayne found himself a captive for the second time.

Later years 
On 2 May 1811, while still in captivity, Napoleon awarded him the title Baron of the Empire. In spring 1814, he was finally released and returned to France. He was now 46, and his sailing career was over – however he was further promoted to Contre-amiral in 1815, and made prefect of Brest during the Hundred Days. He died on 5 November 1817 in Brest at the age of 49.

Notes and references

Notes

References

Bibliography
 

1768 births
1817 deaths
French Navy admirals